The naval Battle of the Solent took place on 18 and 19 July 1545 during the Italian Wars between the fleets of Francis I of France and Henry VIII of England, in the Solent, between Hampshire and the Isle of Wight. The engagement was inconclusive, and is most notable for the sinking of the English carrack, Mary Rose.

Prelude 

In 1545, France launched an invasion of England with 30,000 soldiers in more than 200 ships. Against this armada—larger than the Spanish Armada 43 years later—the English had about 12,000 soldiers and 80 ships.

The French expedition started disastrously, the flagship Carraquon being destroyed on 6July in an accidental fire whilst at anchor in the Seine. Admiral Claude d'Annebault transferred his flag to La Maistresse, which then ran aground as the fleet set sail. The leaks were patched up and the fleet crossed the Channel. The French entered the Solent and landed troops on the Isle of Wight.

Battle 

On 18 July, the English came out of Portsmouth and engaged the French at long range, little damage being done on either side. La Maitresse was close to sinking due to her earlier damage but, although d'Annebault had to change his flagship again, she was saved.

On the night of 18 July, Henry dined aboard Great Harry, the flagship of Admiral John Dudley, Viscount Lisle.

The next day was calm, and the French employed their galleys against the immobile English vessels. Toward evening, a breeze sprang up and, as Mary Rose, the flagship of Vice Admiral George Carew, advanced, she foundered and sank with the loss of all but 35–40 of her crew. The precise reasons are not known, but it was believed at the time that the crew had forgotten to close the lower gunports after firing, so that when she heeled over in the breeze she took on water and sank. A witness with the French fleet believed that the galleys had sunk her, although this is not supported by other contemporary accounts and no physical evidence of this remains.

The wind subsequently died down but Lisle made use of the tides and currents to position his fleet and disrupt the formation of the larger French ships.

Aftermath 

The invasion of the Isle of Wight was repulsed. The attacking troops attempted to divide the defence by landing at several sites but did not venture inland or regroup. There were heavy casualties on both sides at the Battle of Bonchurch, the French at Sandown hastily retreated after losing their commanders in an attack on a newly built fort, and those that landed at Bembridge were ambushed.

On 22 July, unable to resupply, and struggling with a leaking ship and illness among his crew, d'Annebault abandoned the invasion. He recalled the French troops and his fleet departed.

They attempted to pillage a nearby village but were repelled by local militia led by Nicholas Pelham. D’Annebault then returned to France.

References 

Notes

Bibliography
 
 Loades, David, The Tudor Navy: An administrative, political and military history. Scolar Press, Aldershot. 1992. 
 Marsden, Peter, Sealed by Time: The Loss and Recovery of the Mary Rose. The Archaeology of the Mary Rose, Volume 1. The Mary Rose Trust, Portsmouth. 2003. 
 Rodger, Nicholas A. M., The Safeguard of the Sea: A Naval History of Britain 660–1649. W. W. Norton & Company, New York. 1997. 
 Stirland, Ann J., Raising the Dead: The Skeleton Crew of Henry VIII's Great Ship, the Mary Rose. John Wiley & Sons, Chichester. 2000. 

1545 in England
1545 in France
16th century in Hampshire
Conflicts in 1545
Military history of Hampshire
Military history of the Isle of Wight
Solent 1545
Solent 1545
Solent 1545
The Solent
Tudor England
Italian War of 1542–1546